Miloslav Stingl (19 December 1930 – 11 May 2020) was a Czech ethnologist, traveller and author. He is an expert on Mayan culture and the history of pre-Columbian America.

Stingl was born in Bílina. He studied international law at the Faculty of Arts at Charles University before switching to ethnography. He worked for ten years at the Czechoslovak Academy of Sciences from 1962 to 1972. However Stingl signed unaware of the content of the Charter, and later regretted his participation.

References

1930 births
2020 deaths
Czech ethnologists
Czech travel writers
People from Bílina
Charles University alumni